Tarpon Springs is a city in Pinellas County, Florida, United States. The population was 23,484 at the 2010 census. Tarpon Springs has the highest percentage of Greek Americans of any city in the US. Downtown Tarpon Springs has long been a focal point and is undergoing beautification.

History
The region, with a series of bayous feeding into the Gulf of Mexico, was first settled by white and black farmers and fishermen around 1876. Some of the newly arrived visitors spotted tarpon jumping out of the waters and so named the location Tarpon Springs. The name is said to have originated with a remark of Mrs. Ormond Boyer, an early settler from South Carolina, and who, while standing on the shore of the Bayou and seeing fish leaping exclaimed, "See the tarpon spring!' However, for the most part, the fish seen splashing here were mullet rather than tarpon.  In 1882, Hamilton Disston, who in the previous year had purchased the land where the city of Tarpon Springs now stands, ordered the creation of a town plan for the future city. On February 12, 1887, Tarpon Springs became the first incorporated city in what is now Pinellas County. Less than a year later on January 13, 1888, the Orange Belt Railway, the first railroad line to be built in what is now Pinellas County, arrived in the city. During this time the area was developed as a wintering spot for wealthy northerners.

Sponge industry

In the 1880s, John K. Cheyney founded the first local sponge business. The industry continued to grow in the 1890s. Many people from Key West and the Bahamas settled in Tarpon Springs to hook sponges and then process them. A few Greek immigrants also arrived in this city during the 1890s to work in the sponge industry.

In 1905, John Cocoris introduced the technique of sponge diving to Tarpon Springs by recruiting divers and crew members from Greece. The first divers came from the Saronic Gulf islands of Aegina and Hydra, but they were soon outnumbered by those from the Dodecanese islands of Kalymnos, Symi and Halki. The sponge industry soon became one of the leading maritime industries in Florida and the most important business in Tarpon Springs, generating millions of dollars a year. The 1953 film Beneath the 12-Mile Reef, depicting the sponge industry, takes place and was filmed in Tarpon Springs.

In 1947, a red tide algae bloom wiped out the sponge fields in the Gulf of Mexico, causing many of the sponge boats and divers to switch to shrimping for their livelihood, while others left the business. Eventually, the sponges recovered, allowing for a smaller but consistent sponge industry today. In the 1980s, the sponge business experienced a boom due to a sponge disease that killed the Mediterranean sponges. Today there is still a small active sponge industry. 

In 2007 and 2008, the City of Tarpon Springs established Sister City relationships with Kalymnos, Halki, Symi, Hydra, and Larnaca, Cyprus, honoring the close historical link with these Greek-speaking islands.

Historic sites

There are several districts or properties in Tarpon Springs that have been listed on the National Register of Historic Places:
 Tarpon Springs Greektown Historic District
 Tarpon Springs Historic District
 Arcade Hotel
 Old Tarpon Springs City Hall
 Old Tarpon Springs High School
 Safford House
 Rose Hill Cemetery
 Tarpon Springs Depot

Many sites related to the sponge industry within the Greektown District also have been recognized. They include but are not limited to two sponge packing houses:
 E.R. Meres Sponge Packing House
 N.G. Arfaras Sponge Packing House
And several boats:
 N.K. Symi (Sponge Diving Boat)
 St. Nicholas III (Sponge Diving Boat)
 St. Nicholas VI (Sponge Diving Boat)

Geography

Climate

Tarpon Springs' climate borders on humid subtropical and tropical savanna, with warm temperatures year-round, although winter nights are cool. Freezing temperatures ( or lower) occur infrequently, while snowfall is extremely rare; there was accumulation in 1977 and 1989, while the years 1899, 1954, 1958, 1973, 2001, 2006, 2010, and 2014 either saw light snow mixed with rain, or flurries.
Summers are hot and very humid, causing frequent afternoon thunderstorms that can occasionally produce hail, and, even tornadoes or waterspouts off the Gulf of Mexico. Spring and fall are generally warm.

Demographics

As of the census of 2000, there were 21,003 people, 9,067 households, and 5,947 families residing in the city. The racial makeup of the city was 90.07% White, 6.15% African American, 0.29% Native American, 1.04% Asian, 0.06% Pacific Islander, 0.81% from other races, and 1.57% from two or more races. Hispanic or Latino of any race were 4.33% of the population. 11.8% of the total population reported their ancestry as Greek, which is included in the 90.07% White statistic. 8.87% reported speaking Greek at home, while 3.46% speak Spanish, and 1.09% French.

There were 9,067 households, out of which 22.8% had children under the age of 18 living with them, 52.2% were married couples living together, 10.0% had a female householder with no husband present, and 34.4% were non-families. 29.2% of all households were made up of individuals, and 14.6% had someone living alone who was 65 years of age or older. The average household size was 2.27 and the average family size was 2.78.

In the city, the population was spread out, with 19.2% under the age of 18, 6.2% from 18 to 24, 23.9% from 25 to 44, 25.9% from 45 to 64, and 24.8% who were 65 years of age or older. The median age was 45 years. For every 100 females, there were 91.8 males. For every 100 females age 18 and over, there were 89.1 males.

The median income for a household in the city was $38,251, and the median income for a family was $46,316. Males had a median income of $36,356 versus $25,252 for females. The per capita income for the city was $21,504. About 7.7% of families and 9.8% of the population were below the poverty line, including 16.1% of those under age 18 and 7.9% of those age 65 or over.

The town's Rose Cemetery, where black residents are interred, is believed to contain burials which began in the late 1800s; the earliest legible marked burial is from 1904. The cemetery contains the grave of Richard Quarls, a Confederate veteran of the American Civil War who fought alongside his enslaver before moving to Tarpon Springs and choosing the new name "Christopher Columbus", and veterans of subsequent wars.

Arts and culture

Epiphany celebration

Tarpon Springs is known for elaborate religious ceremonies hosted by the St. Nicholas Greek Orthodox Cathedral, part of the Greek Orthodox Church, including the January 6 Epiphany, celebration that includes youths diving for a cross and the blessing of the waters and the boats. Since the first Greek immigrants depended on the sea and their boats for their livelihood, their attachment to a religious service centered on requesting divine protection for what used to be a highly risky job can be easily explained.

The celebration attracts Greek Americans from across the country, and the city's population is known to triple in size for that day. The Metropolitan of Atlanta usually presides over the blessings, sometimes joined by the Archbishop of America. The blessings conclude with the ceremonial throwing of a wooden cross into the city's Spring Bayou, and boys ages 16 to 18 dive in to retrieve it: whoever recovers the cross is said to be blessed for a full year.

Tourism

Dodecanese Avenue in the Greektown Historic District of Tarpon Springs is both part of the traditional Greek community and the city’s primary tourist destination. The street winds its way from Pinellas Avenue west along the Anclote River. Numerous restaurants serve traditional Greek cuisine and fresh seafood.

The nearby beaches, part of the Pinellas County parks, are popular for water activities. Sandy barrier islands off shore shift position over time with the waves and storms. They are accessible by boat and are especially ideal for shell spotting and watching bottlenose dolphins at play. One permanent island, Anclote Key, is a State Park Preserve with a historic lighthouse, bird nesting colonies and pristine beaches.

The Tarpon Springs Heritage Museum in Craig Park offers a permanent exhibition about the history and culture of the Greek Community. The Cultural Center at 101 W. Pinellas Avenue has a changing roster of exhibits about local and regional traditional culture. The Safford House Museum on Parkin Court is a historical house museum that tells the fascinating story of one of the city's early families. The Depot Museum on Tarpon Avenue provides an overview of Tarpon Springs history. The Tarpon Springs Performing Arts Center is a 300-seat theater located inside of historic City hall, 324 Pine Street, and operates year-round bringing an array of nationally touring artists, musicians, dancers, etc. as well as a variety of community theatre plays featuring local actors and directors.

Infrastructure

Police
The Tarpon Springs Police Department has 48 sworn officers.  Of those, 29 are assigned to the patrol division.

Library
The Tarpon Springs Public Library is the public library that services Tarpon Springs, Pinellas, and the greater Tampa Bay area. The library was founded in 1916 Julia Roswell Smith Inness who was the daughter of the owner of the Century Publishing Company. The library is a member of the Pinellas Public Library Cooperative.

Notable people

 Doug Ault, as a rookie with the Toronto Blue Jays, he hit 2 homeruns (and the team's first 2 HRs) in the team's historical inaugural game. After baseball, he lived in Tarpon Springs
 Michael Bilirakis, former United States representative (1983–2007)
 Gus Bilirakis, United States representative (2007–)
 Charles Bishop, caused the 2002 Tampa Cessna 172 crash, inspired by the September 11 attacks 
 Chris Coghlan, outfielder for the Miami Marlins, Chicago Cubs and 2009 Rookie of the Year
 Mason Cole, offensive tackle for the Arizona Cardinals
 Dieselboy, electronic music artist
 Billy "The Kid" Emerson, preacher and former rock and roll pianist and songwriter
 Elaine Esposito, former record holder of the longest coma
 Wayne Fontes, former NFL coach for the Detroit Lions
 Bertie Higgins, singer of "Key Largo"
 William W. Kingsbury, United States House of Representatives, territorial delegate from Minnesota Territory
 Themistocles Leftheris, 2006 Olympian (with Naomi Nari Nam) in pairs figure skating
 Lois Lenski, Newbery Medal-winning children's author
 2 Pistols, rapper
 Artavis Scott, wide receiver for the Los Angeles Chargers

In popular culture
 Tarpon Springs is referenced by Cmdr. Tucker in Star Trek: Enterprise episode "The Crossing".
 Tarpon Springs is referenced in Ring Lardner's short story "The Golden Honeymoon".
 A character in Allen Drury's novel The Throne of Saturn is referenced as "The Greek Loner from Tarpon Springs".
 Tarpon Springs is the setting and primary filming location of the 1954 film Beneath the Twelve-Mile Reef which follows the lives of a family of Greek sponge fishermen and depicts the annual Epiphany celebration.

See also
Greek diaspora
Greektown
Tarpon Springs High School
Pinellas Trail

References

External links

City of Tarpon Springs official website

 
Cities in Florida
Cities in Pinellas County, Florida
Greek-American culture in Florida
Greektowns in the United States
Populated places on the Intracoastal Waterway in Florida
Sponge diving
1876 establishments in Florida
Populated places established in 1876